The 2007 Australian Formula Ford Championship was a CAMS sanctioned motor racing title for drivers of Formula Ford racing cars. It was the 38th national series for Formula Fords to be contested in Australia and the 15th series to carry the Australian Formula Ford Championship name.

Calendar

The championship was contested over an eight-round series with three races per round.
 Round 1, Eastern Creek International Raceway, New South Wales, 7–9 March
 Round 2, Wakefield Park Raceway, New South Wales, 4–6 April
 Round 3, Sandown International Motor Raceway, Victoria, 7–9 June
 Round 4, Hidden Valley Raceway, Northern Territory, 4–6 July
 Round 5, Queensland Raceway, Ipswich, Queensland, 18–20 July
 Round 6, Phillip Island Grand Prix Circuit, Victoria, 12–14 September
 Round 7, Symmons Plains International Raceway, Tasmania, 21–23 September
 Round 8, Oran Park Motorsport Circuit, New South Wales, 5–7 December

Points system
Championship points were awarded on a 20-16-14-12-10-8-6-4-2-1 basis to the top ten finishers in each race, with a bonus point awarded to the driver achieving pole position for the first race at each round.

Championship results

Note: A 5-point penalty was imposed on Nick Percat at Round 4 due to a breach of the Sporting Regulations.

References

External links
 Image of 2007 champion Tim Blanchard in action at the Adelaide Parklands round from www.speedcafe.com.au
 Thumbnail images of the 2007 Championship from www.formulaford.com.au via web.archive.org
 2007 Australian Formula Ford Technical Regulations from www.formulaford.com.au via web.archive.org

Australian Formula Ford Championship seasons
Formula Ford